Artcore Fanzine is a punk zine first published in January 1986, covering punk and hardcore music based out of the United Kingdom. It is published once or twice a year and as well as interviews of new bands, labels and artists. It is also known for the other half of the magazine called Vaultage which covers bands, labels, artists, authors and photographers from throughout the history of this style of music. There have been 40 issues of Artcore published to date (2022) and at least 9 vinyl/CD and cassette releases.

Artcore is edited by "Welly", singer for Four Letter Word, State Funeral and Violent Arrest, graphic designer, and previously roadie for Chaos UK.

References

External links
 
 Artcore fanzine at Discogs
 Welly at Discogs

1986 establishments in the United Kingdom
Annual magazines published in the United Kingdom
Biannual magazines published in the United Kingdom
Music magazines published in the United Kingdom
Magazines established in 1986
Punk zines